The Shipper (The Shipper – ;  'the shipper: imagining you, becoming me') is a 2020 Thai television series starring Kanaphan Puitrakul (First), Sureeyaret Yakaret (Prigkhing), Pawat Chittsawangdee (Ohm), Pusit Disthapisit (Fluke), Kanyarat Ruangrung (Piploy) and Benyapa Jeenprasom (View). Directed by Aticha Tanthanawigrai and produced by GMMTV together with Parbdee Taweesuk, the series follows a high school yaoi writer who, after an accident, wakes up to find herself in the body of one of the boys she is shipping in her novels.

The series was one of the twelve television series for 2020 showcased by GMMTV during their "New & Next" event on 15 October 2019. It premiered on GMM 25 and LINE TV on 22 May 2020, airing on Fridays at 21:30 ICT and 23:00 ICT, respectively. The series concluded on 7 August 2020.

Synopsis 
High school student Pan (Sureeyaret Yakaret) is an ardent shipper of her boy seniors, model student Kim (Kanaphan Puitrakul) and tough guy Way (Pusit Disthapisit), despite the fact that the two are only best friends and are both straight. She and her fellow Kim-Way shipper Soda (Kanyarat Ruangrung) are writing a yaoi novel about the two boys. Soon, things turn ugly for Pan and Soda, when Kim and Way gets involved in a fight with a bully who had read the novel and teased the duo for being homosexuals. Way, who is already in probation for previous offenses, gets expelled. Way's sassy girlfriend Phingphing (Benyapa Jeenprasom) learns about the Kim-Way yaoi and commands her friends to find and bring its authors to her.

Overcome with guilt, Pan comes clean to Kim about the yaoi novel, but the kind-hearted Kim offers to drive her home. Pan and Kim get into an accident on the road and find themselves in limbo, where they meet Yommathut (Watchara Sukchum), the angel of death. The deity has appeared before them to lead them to the afterlife, though the two young mortals learn that they are not dead yet. Realizing her blunder, Yommathut sends them back to the mortal world but, in the process, she accidentally switches their bodies. Pan (Kanaphan Puitrakul) wakes up in a hospital only to find herself in Kim's body.

Clueless on how to fix the mistake, Yommathut promises Pan that she will find a way to swap her and Kim back. Meanwhile, Pan has pretend to be Kim and has to make sure no one will find out the truth. But the body swap has become a chance for her to make her and Soda's Kim-Way ship become a reality.

Cast and characters

Main 
 Kanaphan Puitrakul (First) as Kimhan "Kim" Dhamrong-rattanaroj / Pan (in Kim's body)
 Kimhan "Kim" Dhamrong-rattanaroj: an intelligent model student who represents the school in competitions; Khet's elder brother, and Way's close friend. Kim is being shipped with Way by the yaoi writers Pan and Soda, primarily due to their close relationship. Along with Pan, he meets Yommathut in limbo after their near-fatal vehicular accident. Due to the deity's mistake, his body becomes the receptacle for Pan's soul.
 Pan (in Kim's body): After the accident, Pan returns to the mortal world in Kim's body. She then uses this as a chance to make her Kim-Way ship come true while making sure the people around her remain unaware that she is not Kim.
 Sureeyaret Yakaret (Prigkhing) as Panithita "Pan" Thanachoknavakul
 a yaoi writer who, along with Soda, ardently ships her seniors Kim and Way; Khet's close friend, and Soda's partner. In reality, Pan admires Way but she only wants Way to be with Kim, whom she considers to be a good person. Along with Kim, she meets Yommathut in limbo after their near-fatal vehicular accident. Due to the deity's mistake, her soul returns to the human world only to be placed inside Kim's body.
 Pawat Chittsawangdee (Ohm) as Khemachat "Khet" Dhamrong-rattanaroj
 Pan's close friend, and Kim's younger brother. Khet has a passion for hairdressing and frequently skips class to work part-time in a salon. Knowing that both Kim and Way are straight (and that Way already has a girlfriend), Khet keeps on interrupting and distracting Pan from writing her Kim-Way yaoi story. He has a crush on Pan.
 Pusit Disthapisit (Fluke) as Watit "Way" Wongwannakij
 a student who is in probation due to his frequent involvement in fist fights; Kim's close friend and Phingphing's boyfriend. A tough kind of guy, Way is a former gang member. Unbeknownst to him and Phingphing, he is being shipped with Kim by his juniors Pan and Soda.
 Kanyarat Ruangrung (Piploy) as Sarocha (Soda)
 a yaoi writer who, along with Pan, ardently ships her seniors Kim and Way; Pan and Khet's classmate. Soda is Pan's partner in writing the Kim-Way story.
 Benyapa Jeenprasom (View) as Phingphing
 Pan, Khet, and Soda's classmate. Phingphing is Way's girlfriend. Unknowing at first about the Kim-Way ship, she soon discovers the story and vows to find and punish its writers.

Supporting 
 Watchara Sukchum (Jennie) as Yommathut
 a deity who guides newly deceased souls to the afterlife. Yommathut meets Kim and Pan, who both enter limbo after their near-fatal vehicular accident, and mistakes them to be newly deceased souls. After realizing her blunder, she sends them both back to the mortal world but, in the process, accidentally puts Pan's soul in Kim's body.
 Warinda Damrongphon (Dada) as Teacher Angkana
 Kim and Way's class adviser and math teacher; Kim's secret girlfriend. Angkana is a fierce disciplinarian at school but becomes childish and coquettish when going out with Kim.
 Waratchaya Ophat-sirirat as Nun
 a member of Phingphing's clique
 Chinnaphat Charat-uraisin as Somza
 a member of Phingphing's clique
 Photcharaphon Thepsukdi as Pongpol (Off)
 a bully who, after reading Pan and Soda's Kim-Way yaoi, teased the real life Kim and Way of being homosexuals.
 Wirawit Charoensupphasutthirat as Pipe
 one of Off's henchmen
 Phiradon Si-osot as X
 one of Off's henchmen

Guest role 
 Jumpol Adulkittiporn (Off) (Ep. 12)
 Atthaphan Phunsawat (Gun) (Ep. 12)

Episodes

Soundtracks

Reception

Thailand television ratings 
In the table below,  represents the lowest ratings and  represents the highest ratings.
 N/A denotes that the rating is not known.

 Based on the average audience share per episode.
 Due to some ratings not recorded, the exact average rating is unknown.

International broadcast 
Philippines – The series was among the five GMMTV television series acquired by ABS-CBN Corporation, as announced by Dreamscape Entertainment on 10 September 2020. All episodes were made available for streaming via iWantTFC on 28 December 2020.

Notes

References

External links 
The Shipper on GMM 25 website 
The Shipper  on LINE TV
The Shipper Official Trailer

GMMTV

Television series by GMMTV
2020 Thai television series debuts
2020 Thai television series endings
Thai fantasy television series
Thai romantic comedy television series
Television series by Parbdee Taweesuk
Thai LGBT-related television shows
2020s LGBT-related comedy television series
Limbo
Fiction about body swapping